Sonipat Municipal Corporation or Municipal Corporation of Sonipat is the governing civic body of the Urban Area city Sonipat in Sonipat district, Haryana, India. The Municipal Committee Sonipat was established in 1933. Municipal Corporation mechanism in India was introduced during British Rule with formation of municipal corporation in Madras (Chennai) in 1688, later followed by municipal corporations in Bombay (Mumbai) and Calcutta (Kolkata) by 1762.  Sonipat Municipal Corporation has been formed with functions to improve the infrastructure of town.

History and administration 

Sonipat Municipal Corporation was formed  to improve the infrastructure of the town as per the needs of local population.
Sonipat  Municipal Corporation has been categorised into wards and each ward is headed by councillor for which elections are held every 5 years.

Sonipat Municipal Corporation is governed by mayor and administered by Municipal Commissioner Dharmender Singh.

Departments 

List of departments in Municipal Corporation Sonipat:

Geography 

Revenue sources 

The following are the Income sources for the corporation from the Central and State Government.

Revenue from taxes 
Following is the Tax related revenue for the corporation.

 Property tax.
 Profession tax.
 Entertainment tax.
 Grants from Central and State Government like Goods and Services Tax.
 Advertisement tax.

Revenue from non-tax sources 

Following is the Non Tax related revenue for the corporation.

 Water usage charges.
 Fees from Documentation services.
 Rent received from municipal property.
 Funds from municipal bonds.

References

Municipal corporations in India
Municipal corporations in Haryana
2010 establishments in Haryana